Islam: Empire of Faith is a documentary series, made in 2000, that details the history of Islam, from the birth of the Islamic prophet, Muhammad to the Ottoman Empire.  It is narrated by Ben Kingsley and is available as three DVDs or two video volumes in NTSC format.
  
The first episode deals with the life of Muhammad, the second with the early Caliphates, Crusades, and Mongol invasion, and the third with the Ottoman Empire and Safavid dynasty.

Boston College professors Jonathan Bloom and Sheila Blair served as consultants for the series.

See also
 List of Islamic films
List of films about the Prophet Muhammad

References

External links

2000 films
Documentary films about Islam
2000 in Islam
Religious epic films
2000s English-language films